Mërgim is an Albanian masculine given name and may refer to:
Mërgim Bajraktari (born 1993), Swiss-Albanian footballer
Mërgim Berisha (born 1998), Kosovar-German footballer
Mërgim Brahimi (born 1992), Kosovar footballer
Mërgim Mavraj (born 1986), German-Albanian footballer
Mërgim Neziri (born 1993), German-Albanian footballer 
Mërgim Vojvoda (born 1995), Kosovar footballer

Albanian masculine given names